The San Andres Sports Complex is a sporting venue in San Andres Street, Malate, Manila, Philippines, owned by the local government of Manila.

Usage

Sports 
Then known as the "Mail and More Arena" due to a naming rights agreement, the gymnasium was the home venue of the Manila Metrostars of the Metropolitan Basketball Association at the turn of the millennium.

The gymnasium hosted wrestling at the 2005 Southeast Asian Games.

The San Andres Sports Complex was one of two venues of the 2009 Asian Men's Seniors Volleyball Championship, the other being the nearby Ninoy Aquino Stadium.

Starting in 2018, the Manila Stars of the Maharlika Pilipinas Basketball League and later on with the Pilipinas Super League uses the gymnasium as its home venue.

John Riel Casimero successfully defended his World Boxing Organization interim bantamweight championship against Mexican Cesar Ramirez at the San Andres Sports Complex in 2019 via tenth-round knockout.

The National Collegiate Athletic Association (Philippines) held its seniors volleyball and the latter part of its juniors basketball tournaments in the venue in 2023. In the same year. the University Athletic Association of the Philippines opened its high school basketball tournament at the venue.

Other 
The local government of Manila usages the venue of other purposes.

The canvassing of votes during the 2019 Manila local elections, where former vice mayor Isko Moreno was proclaimed the winner over incumbent mayor Joseph Estrada and former mayor Alfredo Lim, was held there.

It was used as a quarantine facility during the COVID-19 pandemic in 2020, then as a vaccination center of the COVID-19 vaccine in 2021. The venue was used as a distribution center of Christmas packages by the local government in 2022.

References 

Sports venues in Manila
Sports complexes in the Philippines